Shabdasrishti, the journal of the Gujarat Sahitya Akademi, is a Gujarati literary magazine, published on the fifth of every month. The magazine was started in 1983, a year after the establishment of the Akademi. Shabdakhya Jyoti Prakasho (Devnagari: शब्दाख्यज्योति प्रकाशो) is a motto of this magazine.

History
The first issue of Shabdasrishti was published in October 1983 under the editorship of Suman Shah. Shah served as an editor until May 1986, followed by Jyotish Jani from October 1986 to February 1990. The third editor of the magazine was Pravin Darji, who served from January 1992 until December 1994. It was then edited by Harshad Trivedi from January 1995 until October 2013. After Harshad Trivedi, no particular individuals have taken this position. Instead, the magazine has been edited by associate writers Bhagyesh Jha, Rajendra Patel and Dakshesh Thakar. In May 2017, Vishnu Pandya became president of the Akademi, and Shabdasrishti has begun to be published under his editorship.

See also
 List of Gujarati-language magazines

References

Further reading

External links
 
 

1983 establishments in Gujarat
Gujarati-language magazines
Literary magazines published in India
Monthly magazines published in India
Magazines established in 1983